The list of presidents of the Government of Catalonia compiles the official list of presidents of the Generalitat de Catalunya since its inception in 1359 to present time. It has been the traditional way of listing presidents, starting with Berenguer de Cruïlles. The most recent stable version of the list dates from 2003, by Josep M. Solé i Sabaté in his work Historia de la Generalitat de Catalunya i dels seus presidents. The procedure to set up this list is the following: for the period of the medieval Generalitat (Deputation of the General), the president was the most eminent ecclesiastic deputy of the Deputation of the General of Catalonia (popularly known as Generalitat), a body of the Catalan Courts dissolved in 1716 and reinstated for two years in 1874. From April 1931 on, the list includes the elected presidents as well as the proclaimed exiled presidents during the Francoist dictatorship. The functions of the President of the Government of Catalonia have varied considerably over history, in parallel with the attributions of the Generalitat itself.

Deputation of the General or Generalitat (1359–1716)

Fourteenth century 
Here follows a list of representatives of Catalan institutions through the ages. The Presidents as such first appeared with the modern Generalitat in the 20th century.
Berenguer de Cruïlles, Bishop of Girona (1359–1366)
Romeu Sescomes, Bishop of Lleida (1363–1364)
Ramon Gener (1364–1365)
Bernat Vallès, canon of Barcelona (1365–1367)
Romeu Sescomes, Bishop of Lleida (1375–1376)
Joan I d'Empúries (1376)
Guillem de Guimerà i d'Abella, Grand Prior of the Hospitaller Order of St. John of Jerusalem (1376–1377)
Galceren de Besora i de Cartellà, almoner of Ripoll (1377–1378)
Ramon Gener (1379–1380)
Felip d'Anglesola, canon of Tarragona (1380)
Pere de Santamans, canon of Tortosa (1381–1383)
Arnau Descolomer, cleric from Girona (1384–1389)
Miquel de Santjoan, canon of Girona (1389–1396)
Alfons de Tous, canon of Barcelona (1396–1413)

Fifteenth century

Sixteenth century

Seventeenth century

Eighteenth century

Modern Generalitat (1931present)

Second Republic and exile (19311977)
Governments:

Restored autonomy (1977present)
Governments:

Timeline

See also
Generalitat de Catalunya
President of the Government of Catalonia

Notes

 Died in office assassinated.

References

External links
 Presidents of the Generalitat

Catalonia
Catalonia, Presidents
Catalonia-related lists